Dentifovea fulvifascialis is a species of moth in the family Crambidae. It is found in Greece, Lebanon, Israel and India.

The larvae feed Heliotropium rotundfolium and probably other Heliotropium species. They mine the leaves of their host plant. The mine has the form of a full depth blotch, usually starting at the tip of the leaf. Pupation takes place within the mine. Larvae can be found in May.

References

Moths described in 1887
Odontiini
Moths of Europe
Moths of Asia